Podbucze  is a village in Gmina Godów, Wodzisław County, Silesian Voivodeship, southern Poland. It has a population of 204 and lies close to the border with the Czech Republic.

References

Villages in Wodzisław County